FBLA may refer to:

"FBLA", a song by Helmet from their 1990 album Strap It On
"FBLA II", a song by Helmet from their 1992 album Meantime
FBLA-PBL (Future Business Leaders of America), an international career and technical student organization